Shane Cassells (born 6 April 1978) is an Irish Fianna Fáil politician who has served as a Senator for the Labour Panel since April 2020. He previously served as a Teachta Dála (TD) for the Meath West constituency from 2016 to 2020. 

Before being elected as a TD, Cassells worked for the Fingal Independent as a sports journalist, and with publishing house Devlin Media. He is a nephew of footballer Joe Cassells and of Peter Cassells, former head of the Irish Congress of Trade Unions. 

Cassells was first elected to Navan City Council in 1999, and was a member of Meath County Council from 2004 to 2016, serving as Mayor of Navan twice. He contested the 2005 Meath by-election for Fianna Fáil but was not elected. He contested the 2011 Irish general election in the Meath West constituency, but again was not elected.

He was elected on his third attempt at the 2016 general election, and his seat was considered to be safe, but he lost his seat at the 2020 general election, as his share of first preferences fell from 27.4% to 16.2%.

In April 2020, he was elected to Seanad Éireann as a Senator for the Labour Panel.

Cassells is married to Fiona and has three children.

References

External links
Shane Cassells' page on the Fianna Fáil website

Living people
People from Navan
Members of the 32nd Dáil
Members of the 26th Seanad
Fianna Fáil TDs
Mayors of places in the Republic of Ireland
Local councillors in County Meath
1971 births
Fianna Fáil senators